Ștefan I. Nenițescu (October 8, 1897–October 1979) was a Romanian poet and aesthetician.

Biography

Education
Born in Bucharest, his parents were the poet Ioan S. Nenițescu and his wife Elena (née Ștefan). He attended Sapienza University of Rome from 1920, as well as the literature and philosophy department of Bucharest University. At first an assistant professor of aesthetics, he later became an associate professor at Bucharest. He served as press secretary and later economic adviser to the Romanian legation in The Hague.

Literary work
Nenițescu's first publication was a 1915 article about William Shakespeare that appeared in Noua revistă română. His first book of poetry, Denii (1919), was followed by Vrajă (1923) and Ode italice (1925). His single volume of theatre was Trei mistere (1922). From 1924, he wrote for Gândirea, and was a founding member of Romania's PEN Club. He also contributed poetry and art criticism to Convorbiri Literare, Ideea europeană, Vremea, Universul literar, Viața Românească, Adevărul and Arta plastică. In 1925, Nenițescu published a treatise, Istoria artei ca filosofie a istoriei. He translated from Benedetto Croce (Aesthetic, 1922) and Niccolò Machiavelli (The Mandrake, 1926).

Initially, Nenițescu's poetry was discursive and religious, in line with the Gândirist current. His verse became progressively more hermetic, as can be seen in the anthology volume Ani (1973). Including texts published in the 1940s and '50s, it reveals the intellectualized lyric verse of an eminently classical nature.

Notes

External links
 All of these underneath external links are in the Romanian language.
 Ștefan I. Nenițescu on Autorii.com
 Prezentare scurtă - Ștefan I. Nenițescu — Short presentation, Ștefan I. Nenițescu
 Poezii de (Poems by) Ștefan I. Nenițescu on Poezie.ro
 Trei mistere de Ștefan I. Nenițescu — Three Misteries by Ștefan I. Nenițescu - a radio adaptation of the original play on the web site MixCloud

1897 births
1979 deaths
20th-century Romanian dramatists and playwrights
20th-century translators
Gândirea
Italian–Romanian translators
People from Bucharest
Romanian art critics
Romanian literary critics
Romanian poets
Romanian translators
University of Bucharest alumni
Academic staff of the University of Bucharest